Yajamana is a 2000 Indian Kannada-language film directed by R. Sheshadri and Radha Bharathi. The film is a remake of Tamil film Vaanathaippola (2000), the movie became an Industry hit by creating many records. The film stars Dr.Vishnuvardhan, Prema, Shashikumar and Abhijeeth.

Plot
Shankar sacrifices his own interests and refuses to marry in order to support and educate his younger brothers. However, his life changes when a girl falls in love with him.

Cast 

 Vishnuvardhan as Shankar / Ganesha
 Shashi Kumar as Subramanya
 Prema as Sangeetha
 Abhijith as Shanmukha
 Avinash as Devaraj
 Ramesh Bhat as Ramesh
 Tennis Krishna as Tippesha
 Pavitra Lokesh as Lakshmi
 Swathi as Keerti
 M. N. Lakshmi Devi as Ammamma
 Lakshman as Rajeeva, Sangeetha's father
 Ashalatha as Sangeetha's mother
 Shivaram as hotel owner
 Vijaya Sarathi as Swamiji at hotel
 Archana
 Shobaraj
 Michael Madhu as Beggar

Soundtrack 

The official soundtrack contains all songs tuned by Rajesh Ramanath with all the tunes reprising from the Tamil original composed by S. A. Rajkumar except the song "Mysore Mallige". Lyrics for the tracks were penned by K. Kalyan. The album consists of eight tracks. The song "Namma Maneyalli" is based on "Dil Deewana" from the Hindi film Daag (1999). The audio rights for the film was purchased by Anand Audio for 9 Lack Rupees. Interestingly, the audio company earned 113 times their investment making 8 Crore rupees f

Reception 
The film opened to positive reviews from critics and media. Vishnuvardhan's acting and Music by Rajesh Ramnath were appreciated.

Box office
The film struck a chord with the audience and went on to create many records. It completed 100 days in 130 main centres, 25 weeks in 51 main centres, 35 weeks in 42 centres and 1 Year in 4 main centres including Ramakanth Theatre in Mangaluru and shankar theatre Chitradurga.

References

External links 
 

2000s Kannada-language films
2000 films
Kannada remakes of Tamil films
Films scored by Rajesh Ramnath
Indian drama films
2000 drama films
Films directed by Radha Bharathi